Caitríona Ruane (born 1962) is a Sinn Féin politician who served as the Principal Deputy Speaker of the Northern Ireland Assembly from 2016 to 2017, and was a Member of the Northern Ireland Assembly (MLA) for South Down from 2003 to 2017.

In the first Northern Ireland Executive under First Minister Ian Paisley and deputy First Minister Martin McGuinness she was appointed Minister of Education. She faced opposition over the scrapping of the Transfer Examination (11-plus) and her subsequent plans for a replacement. She was replaced by John O'Dowd after the 2011 election.

Background
Ruane is a former professional tennis player who represented Ireland in the Fed Cup. She now lives in Carlingford, County Louth and is married with two children. In the past Ruane has acted as director of the Féile an Phobail and chairperson of the St Patrick's Carnival Committee in Belfast.

"Bring Them Home" campaign
Ruane was a prominent member of the Bring Them Home campaign for the Colombia Three, which sought the safe return of three Irishmen later convicted in their absence in Colombia of training FARC insurgents.

Abolition of the 11-plus
Ruane has faced opposition for her support for abolition of the 11-plus examination, originally planned by her predecessor Martin McGuinness. She has faced opposition from the Democratic Unionist Party and Social Democratic and Labour Party as well as from 30 grammar schools in Northern Ireland, causing them to form the AQE (Association for Quality Education), which offered a replacement for the transfer examination. She was alleged to have delayed the publication of a report which showed that public opinion favoured academic selection.

In March 2011, Ruane caused controversy by claiming that all pupils should be given the opportunity to study the Irish language, that education in Northern Ireland should be made more similar to that in the Republic of Ireland, and that "the debate on academic selection is now over". Director of the Governing Bodies Association, which represents Northern Irish grammar schools, John Hart, said, "I think the minister is fooling only herself in trying to convince us that the debate surrounding academic selection is over. Some 26,000 parents last year did not think it was over. As we have said in the past, the minister washed her hands of responsibility for academic selection, so she would be better letting those with a more responsible approach get on with it, instead of petty badgering."

See also
 Caitriona

References

External links
 Profile on Sinn Féin website
 

1962 births
Living people
Irish female tennis players
Irish socialists
Ministers of the Northern Ireland Executive (since 1999)
Sinn Féin MLAs
Northern Ireland MLAs 2003–2007
Northern Ireland MLAs 2007–2011
Northern Ireland MLAs 2011–2016
Female members of the Northern Ireland Assembly
Politicians from County Louth
Sportspeople from County Louth
Politicians from County Mayo
Sportspeople from County Mayo
Northern Ireland MLAs 2016–2017
Women ministers of the Northern Ireland Executive
People from Swinford, County Mayo
Irish sportsperson-politicians
Sinn Féin parliamentary candidates